The Northern State Conference was the name of two separate IHSAA-Sanctioned athletic conferences. The most recent version was an eight-member conference within the Northern Indiana counties of Elkhart, LaPorte, Marshall, St. Joseph, and Starke. Some former member schools draw students from Fulton, Kosciusko and Pulaski counties.

The earlier NSC lasted from 1954 to 1963, including schools from Carroll, Elkhart, Jasper, Marshall, Newton, St. Joseph, and Starke counties. Jimtown was the only holdover from the earlier conference into the modern one, though Bremen and Knox did join the current version in the 1980s.

In 2013, Culver and Knox announced that they would be leaving the conference after the 2014–2015 school year in order to join the Hoosier North Athletic Conference with three schools from the Midwest Conference and Independent North Judson. LaVille and Triton decided to join the HNAC at the same time. The remaining four schools joined the Northern Indiana Athletic Conference, ensuring the end of the conference.

Membership

Old Northern State Conference Membership

 Jimtown was known as Baugo Township until 1961.

State Championships

Bremen (2)

 1989 Football (A)
 1994 Football (2A)

Culver Community (0)

Glenn (0)

Jimtown (6)

 1974 Boys Gymnastics
 1991 Football (A)
 1997 Football (2A)
 1998 Football (2A)
 2004 Boys Basketball (2A)
 2005 Football (2A)

Knox Community (0)

New Prairie (0)

Triton (4)

 2000 Girls Basketball (A)
 2001 Girls Basketball (A)
 2001 Baseball (A)
 2008 Boys Basketball (A)

Resources 
 IHSAA Conferences
 IHSAA Directory

References 

Indiana high school athletic conferences
High school sports conferences and leagues in the United States